Najah Al-Attar (born 10 January 1933) is the Vice President of Syria, since 2006. She is the first Arab woman to have held the post. Previously she was Minister of Culture from 1976 to 2000.

Early life and education
Attar was born on 10 January 1933 and raised in Damascus as a member of a Sunni Muslim family. Her father was among the first Arab nationalist leaders who took part in the 1925-1927 Syrian revolt against the French Mandate of Syria. She studied at the University of Damascus, graduating in 1954, and obtained a PhD in Arabic literature from the University of Edinburgh in the United Kingdom in 1958. She also received a number of certificates then in international relations and in literary and art criticism.

Career
Attar is an accomplished translator and started teaching in high schools within Damascus after her return from Scotland, then worked in the Department of Translation of the Syrian Ministry of Culture. In 1976, she was appointed as Minister of Culture, serving in that post until 2000. On 23 March 2006, she was appointed as Vice President.

Political alignment
Although Attar is Vice President and served as a long-term minister in Syria, a state largely controlled by the secular Ba'ath Party, her brother, Issam al-Attar, is the leader of the Damascus faction of the Syrian Muslim Brotherhood and has lived in exile in Aachen, West Germany since the 1970s, which saw a government persecution of various Islamist political movements.

References

1933 births
Living people
Damascus University alumni
Alumni of the University of Edinburgh
Vice presidents of Syria
Syrian ministers of culture
Arab Socialist Ba'ath Party – Syria Region politicians
Syrian Sunni Muslims
Women government ministers of Syria
20th-century Syrian women politicians
20th-century Syrian politicians
21st-century Syrian women politicians
21st-century Syrian politicians
Women vice presidents